Instituto de Música Juan Morel Campos (English: Juan Morel Campos Music Institute), formerly known as Escuela Libre de Música de Ponce (English: Ponce Free School of Music), is a musical arts institution in Ponce, Puerto Rico. It is an institution of the Ponce Municipal Government. Its first director was Librado Net Pérez.

History

The school was founded in 1947 under the municipal administration of Mayor Andrés Grillasca Salas as the Escuela Libre de Música de Ponce (Ponce Free School of Music).

The school's first location was at the structure previously occupied by the Liceo de Ponce (Liceo Ponceño), an early 20th-century girls-only school on the northwest corner of Salud and Cristina streets.

In 1977 the name Escuela Libre de Música de Ponce name was changed to Escuela Libre de Música Juan Morel Campos, after the Ponce composer and conductor. In 1980, the Institute was officially reorganized under mayor Jose Guillermo Tormos Vega as an entity of the Municipal Government. Enrollment growth and increased school offerings resulted in the school expanding its headquarters.

In 2008, the school expanded again by acquiring a new site on the corner of Calle Cristina and Calle Mayor streets, opposite Teatro La Perla. The new site included additional classrooms, new administrative offices and an amphitheater. A mosaic mural titled "La Abnegacion" (Selflessness) by Rafael Ríos Rey commemorates the building's former use as a fire station. Ponce Municipal decree #40 (2012-2013) renamed the institution to Instituto de Música Juan Morel Campos.

Construction and appearance
The Institute's first structure, at the northwest corner of Cristina and Salud streets, was built in the Art Deco style. The new building at the southwest corner of Cristina and Mayor Cantera streets is a former fire station, which was built in recto-linear fashion following modern architectural style. The front yard of the Institute at Calle Cristina contains the only olive tree planted in Puerto Rico. This building had been the former location of the Ponce regional headquarters of the Bomberos de Puerto Rico.

Organizations
The Institute has several musical organizations. Among them are Coro de Niños (Children's Choir) and Coro Juvenil (Youth Choir), both directed by music professor María Asunción Ondarra Fombellida. It also has a Conjunto de Tiples (Treble Ensemble), led by professor Héctor Hernández. There is also a  Conjunto de Cuerdas Punteadas (Plucked Strings Ensemble). In addition there is an Orquesta Sinfonica Juvenil (Youth Symphony Orchestra), Banda Juvenil (Youth Band), Conjunto de Metales (Metal Ensemble), Conjunto de Cañas (Reeds Ensemble), Conjunto de Percusión (Percussion Ensemble), and Conjunto de Acordeones (Accordion Ensemble).

Accolades
Its symphony orchestra received a Senate Resolution from the Puerto Rico Senate in 2010.

Notable alumni
 Yovianna Garcia
 Héctor Lavoe
 José (Cheo) Feliciano
 Papo Lucca

See also
 List of high schools in Puerto Rico

References

External links
 Escuela Libre de Musica. Ponce: La Capital del Sur de Puerto Rico. Retrieved 5 February 2014.
 Joyas Artisticas del Ponce del Ayer.  Luis Antonio Rodriguez Vázquez. In, Vida, Pasión y Muerte a Orillas del Río Baramaya. (Ediciones Arybet. Ponce, PR. 2010) Accessed 20 July 2017.

School buildings completed in 1947
Cultural history of Puerto Rico
History of Puerto Rico
High schools in Ponce, Puerto Rico
1947 in Puerto Rico
1947 establishments in Puerto Rico
Music schools in Puerto Rico
Educational institutions established in 1947
Firefighting in Puerto Rico
Education in Ponce, Puerto Rico
Art Deco architecture in Puerto Rico
Firefighting academies
Government of Ponce, Puerto Rico